Lie Still is a 2013 novel by Julia Heaberlin, published by Bantam Books in the US and Faber & Faber in the UK

ISBN Number: 978-0-571-29902-7

References
"Lie Still by Julia Heaberlin". Booklist. 20 May 2013.
"Lie Still by Julia Heaberlin". Publishers Weekly. 6 May 2013.
Joy Tipping. "Lie Still by Julia Heaberlin". Dallas Morning News. 16 August 2013.
Christopher Kelly. "Orphans, Drug Wars and Other Mysteries". New York Times. 13 July 2013.

2013 American novels
Novels set in Texas
Bantam Books books
Faber Grand Prix